Clipper is a 1982 video game written by John S. Bayes for the Atari 8-bit family and published by Program Design, Inc.

Gameplay
Clipper is a game in which the player is the Captain of an 1850s Clipper ship in a sailing simulation.

Reception
Mark Bausman reviewed the game for Computer Gaming World, and stated that "The game plays well but I found the constant shifts in wind to be a bit frustrating. The instruction book is very helpful and gives many hints on how to play this game. It also includes a little historical background on Clipper ships and a playing aid to help novice sailors keep their Clipper on course."

References

External links
Clipper at Atari Mania
Addison-Wesley Book of Atari Software 1984
Review in Electronic Games
Review in Antic

1982 video games
Atari 8-bit family games
Atari 8-bit family-only games
Sailing simulators
Video games developed in the United States
Video games set in the 19th century